Abdullah Al-Hulaili (born 16 June 1994) is a Saudi Arabian handball player for Mudhar and the Saudi Arabian national team.

References

1994 births
Living people
Saudi Arabian male handball players
Place of birth missing (living people)
21st-century Saudi Arabian people